The 2015 Bill Beaumont Cup, also known as Bill Beaumont Cup Division One, was the 115th version of the annual, English rugby union, County Championship organized by the RFU for the top tier English counties.  Each county drew its players from rugby union clubs from the third tier and below of the English rugby union league system (typically National League 1, National League 2 South or National League 2 North).  The counties were divided into two regional pools with the winners of each pool meeting in the final held at Twickenham Stadium.  New counties to the competition were the two finalists from the 2014 County Championship Plate – Kent (winners) and Durham County (runners-up) who replaced North Midlands and Northumberland.  Lancashire were the defending champions.

At the end of the group stage, Lancashire won the northern division with relative ease to book their place in the final for the seventh successive year while Cornwall joined them, squeezing through by defeating Hertfordshire in the last game of the southern group having trailed 18 - 6 at half time.  Both Durham County and Kent made an instant return to the 2016 County Championship Plate after being relegated by coming bottom of their respective groups. The 2015 final was a repeat of the previous two seasons with Cornwall this time turning the tables on holders Lancashire and winning their first county title since 1999 in an 18 - 13 victory.  Cornish All Black scrum half Matthew Shepherd was man of the match with two tries and also finished as the competition's top scorer.

Competition format
The competition format was two regional group stages divided into north and south, with each team playing each other once.  This meant that two teams in the pool had two home games, while the other two had just one.  The top side in each group went through to the final held at Twickenham Stadium on 31 May 2015.  The bottom side in each group was relegated to the second tier of the county championships for the following season, with the finalists from that division replacing them.

Participating Counties and ground locations

Group stage

Division 1 North

Round 1

Round 2

Round 3

Division 1 South

Round 1

Round 2

Round 3

Final

Total season attendances
Does not include final at Twickenham which is a neutral venue and involves teams from all three county divisions on the same day

Individual statistics
 Note if players are tied on tries or points the player with the lowest number of appearances will come first.  Also note that points scorers includes tries as well as conversions, penalties and drop goals.  Appearance figures also include coming on as substitutes (unused substitutes not included).  Statistics will also include final.

Top points scorers

Top try scorers

See also
 English rugby union system
 Rugby union in England

References

External links
 NCA Rugby

2015